Civil Servant-Family Pair Up, also known as Pair Up and Become Family, is a Chinese government policy that forces designated Uyghur families to be matched with Han Chinese civil servants, with the families forced to host the civil servants in their home. Since the late 2010s, China has vigorously promoted the policy in Xinjiang. Beginning in 2018, over one million Chinese government workers began forcibly living in the homes of Uyghur families to monitor and assess resistance to cultural assimilation as well as to surveil religious and cultural practices. According to the official state perspective, the policy is to provide Mandarin language training as a way to better integrate Uyghurs and as a means for the poverty alleviation of the region. Policies bearing the same name have also been implemented in impoverished regions in Anhui, Tibet,  as well as for left-behind children, widowed elders, the disabled, and in earthquake-affected regions.

Hosting requirements have increased over time across counties and prefectures, ranging from 5 days per month to 14 days per month. Despite this, overseas Uyghurs have stated that 'visitation' times often exceeded the time requirement, with one stating that visits regularly occurred up to four times per week and eventually became full-time. Refusal to host leads to imprisonment in an internment camp.

According to Radio Free Asia, these Han Chinese government workers have been trained to call themselves "relatives" and engage in the forcible co-habitation of Uyghur homes for the purpose of promoting "ethnic unity". Radio Free Asia reports that these men "regularly sleep in the same beds as the wives of men detained in the region’s internment camps." Chinese officials maintain that co-sleeping is acceptable, provided that a distance of one meter is maintained between the women and the "relative" assigned to the Uyghur home. Uyghur activists state that no such restraint takes place, citing pregnancy and forced marriage numbers, and name the program a campaign of "mass rape disguised as 'marriage'." Human Rights Watch has condemned the Pair Up and Become Family Program as a "deeply invasive forced assimilation practice", while the World Uyghur Congress states that it represents the "total annihilation of the safety, security and well-being of family members."

See also 
 Billet
 Uyghur genocide
Sinicization
Targeted Poverty Alleviation

References 

Cultural assimilation
Human rights of ethnic minorities in China
Islam in China

Language policy in Xinjiang
Linguistic discrimination
Political repression in China
Separatism in China
Politics of Xinjiang
Racism in China
Violence against Muslims
Religious persecution by communists
Ethnic cleansing in Asia
Xinjiang conflict
Counterterrorism in China
Anti-Islam sentiment in China
Human rights abuses in China
Persecution of Uyghurs
Genocides in Asia